Leacock Township is a township in east central Lancaster County, Pennsylvania. As of the 2020 census, the population of the township was 5,652, up from 5,220 at the 2010 census. The township has a large Amish and Mennonite population.

According to the 2020 "ACS 5-Year Estimates Data Profiles", 40.9% of the township's population spoke only English, while 55.7 spoke an "other [than Spanish] Indo-European language."

Geography
It contains the unincorporated communities of Intercourse, Gordonville, Weavertown, Irishtown, Mascot, and parts of Soudersburg and New Milltown.

Demographics

At the 2000 census, there were 4,878 people, 1,426 households, and 1,159 families living in the township.  The population density was 236.0 people per square mile (91.1/km2).  There were 1,476 housing units at an average density of 71.4/sq mi (27.6/km2).  The racial makeup of the township was 98.11% White, 0.41% African American, 0.12% Native American, 0.72% Asian, 0.02% Pacific Islander, 0.14% from other races, and 0.47% from two or more races. Hispanic or Latino of any race were 0.59%.

There were 1,426 households, 41.4% had children under the age of 18 living with them, 73.8% were married couples living together, 5.3% had a female householder with no husband present, and 18.7% were non-families. 16.7% of households were made up of individuals, and 9.0% were one person aged 65 or older.  The average household size was 3.42 and the average family size was 3.91.

The age distribution was 36.1% under the age of 18, 12.3% from 18 to 24, 21.4% from 25 to 44, 18.0% from 45 to 64, and 12.2% 65 or older.  The median age was 26 years. For every 100 females there were 101.2 males.  For every 100 females age 18 and over, there were 97.1 males.

The median household income was $36,887 and the median family income  was $41,639. Males had a median income of $30,725 versus $22,917 for females. The per capita income for the township was $12,848.  About 12.5% of families and 15.4% of the population were below the poverty line, including 19.8% of those under age 18 and 19.2% of those age 65 or over.

References

External links

1728 establishments in Pennsylvania
Populated places established in 1728
Townships in Lancaster County, Pennsylvania